The Palm Beach Daily News Building is a historic site in Palm Beach, Florida. It is located at 204 Brazilian Avenue. On December 24, 1985, it was added to the U.S. National Register of Historic Places.

References

External links

 Palm Beach County listings at National Register of Historic Places
 Florida's Office of Cultural and Historical Programs
 Palm Beach County listings
 Old Palm Beach Daily News Building

National Register of Historic Places in Palm Beach County, Florida
Newspaper headquarters in the United States